The Sideboard was a magazine published by Wizards of the Coast that covered Magic: The Gathering tournaments and expert play. After six years of publication, it ceased its print activities and much of the content from The Sideboard (along with the content from its website) was folded into magicthegathering.com.

Originally titled The Duelist Sideboard, the first issue was a full-color, 32-page issue published in July 1996. The cover story was a preview of the upcoming Magic World Championships. The next six issues were also full-color, and ran through July 1997.

The Duelist Sideboard became a tabloid-size newspaper with its next issue (September 1997) and featured Jakub Slemr, who had just won the 1997 Magic World Championship. Two issues later (Issue 10) it dropped the "Duelist", becoming just The Sideboard. It stayed a tabloid through January 2000; the last newspaper-style issue was issue 28, which featured Bob Maher, Jr. after he won at Pro Tour Chicago.

In March 2000, Issue 29 brought The Sideboard back to a full-color magazine, which was how it stayed through November 2003; the last issue (Issue 49) featured coverage of that year's World Championships and its winner, Daniel Zink. In issue 33, it dropped "The" from its name and became just Sideboard.

Editors of The Sideboard
 Terry Melia (Issue 1–9)
 Andy Collins (Issue 10–14)
 Monty Ashley (Issue 15–32)
 Omeed Dariani (Issue 33–37)
 Thomas Pannell (Issue 38–49)
 Kate Stavola (Issue 49)

See also 
 The Duelist, a sister publication to The Sideboard which was also produced by Wizards of the Coast

External links 
 Official site for Magic: The Gathering

Card game magazines
Magazines established in 1996
Magazines disestablished in 2003
Magic: The Gathering publications
Wizards of the Coast magazines
Defunct magazines published in the United States